The Rural Municipality of Deer Forks No. 232 is a rural municipality (RM) in the Canadian province of Saskatchewan within Census Division No. 8 and  Division No. 3. Located in the southwest portion of the province, it is adjacent to the Alberta boundary, neighbouring Cypress County to the west.

History 
The RM of Deer Forks No. 232 incorporated as a rural municipality on January 1, 1913.

Geography

Communities and localities 
The following urban municipalities are surrounded by the RM.

Towns
Burstall

The following unincorporated communities are within the RM.

Localities
Estuary
Gascoigne

Demographics 

Government 
The RM of Deer Forks No. 232 is governed by an elected municipal council and an appointed administrator that meets on the second Wednesday of every month. The reeve of the RM is Doug Smith while its administrator is Kim Lacelle. The RM's office is located in Burstall.

See also 
List of rural municipalities in Saskatchewan

References

External links 

D
Deer Forks No. 232, Saskatchewan